Sovjak is a settlement in the Municipality of Sveti Jurij ob Ščavnici in northeastern Slovenia. It lies in the Slovene Hills in the traditional region of Styria. The entire municipality is now included in the Mura Statistical Region.

References

External links
Sovjak at Geopedia

Populated places in the Municipality of Sveti Jurij ob Ščavnici